甲山 may refer to:
Mount Kabuto, Nishinomiya, Hyōgo, Japan
Kōzan, Hiroshima, former town in Sera District, Hiroshima Prefecture, Japan
Kapsan County, Ryanggang Province, North Korea
Jiashan Township, Jilin, in Dongliao County, Jilin, China

See also
Koyama (disambiguation)